George Irvine Whiteside (20 September 1902 – 27 July 1976) was an Australian politician.

Born in Victoria, he was educated at state schools before moving to Queensland to become a railway worker. He was Queensland Secretary of the Federated Engine Drivers and Firemen's Association 1945–1962 and President of the Queensland Labor Party 1959–1960.

Labor Senator for Queensland Max Poulter died in 1962 and Labor had nominated the unsuccessful candidate, Alf Arnell, to fill the casual vacancy however he was rejected by the Queensland Legislative Assembly. Labor then nominated Whiteside who was appointed on 9 October 1962. The Australian Constitution dictated that a special election be held at the same time as the next federal election in 1963. Whiteside was narrowly defeated by Liberal candidate Kenneth Morris.

Whiteside died in Brisbane in 1976, aged 73.

References

1902 births
1976 deaths
Australian Labor Party members of the Parliament of Australia
Members of the Australian Senate for Queensland
Members of the Australian Senate
20th-century Australian politicians
People from Footscray, Victoria
Politicians from Queensland
Politicians from Melbourne